Azzurra D'Intino (born 25 October 1991) is an Italian professional racing cyclist. She rides for the S.C. Michela Fanini Rox team.

See also
 List of 2015 UCI Women's Teams and riders

References

External links
 

1991 births
Living people
Italian female cyclists
Place of birth missing (living people)
Sportspeople from Pescara
Cyclists from Abruzzo